Synaphea quartzitica is a shrub endemic to Western Australia.

The small and tufted shrub blooms between July and August producing yellow flowers.

It is found on quartzite hills in the Wheatbelt region of Western Australia near Moora where it grows in sandy soils often with gravel.

References

Eudicots of Western Australia
quartzitica
Endemic flora of Western Australia
Plants described in 1995